Petrushin (masculine), Petrushina (feminine) is a Russian-language surname. Notable people with the surname include:

Aleksei Petrushin (born 1952), Russian footballer
Sergey Petrushin, Russian entrepreneur
Nikolay Petrushin (born 1979), Russian ski jumper
 (born 1997), Russian - Swedish comedian and presenter .
 (born 1990), Russian basketball player

Russian-language surnames